Allenhurst may refer to:

In the United States
 Allenhurst, Florida
 Allenhurst, Georgia
 The Dr. Arthur W. Allen Home in Robinson, Illinois, also known as Allenhurst
Allenhurst (Scott County, Kentucky), near Georgetown, Kentucky, listed on the National Register of Historic Places
 Allenhurst, New Jersey
 Allenhurst, Texas